Jake Eberts, OC (July 10, 1941 – September 6, 2012) was a Canadian film producer, executive and financier. He was known for risk-taking and producing a consistently high caliber of movies including such Academy Award-winning titles as Chariots of Fire (1981, uncredited), Gandhi (1982), Dances with Wolves (1990), and the successful animated feature Chicken Run (2000).

Life and career 
Eberts was born John David Eberts in Montreal, Quebec, Canada, the son of Elizabeth (MacDougall), an interior decorator, and Edmond Eberts, who worked for an aluminum manufacturer. Eberts grew up in Montreal and Arvida. He attended Bishop's College School in Lennoxville, Quebec and graduated from McGill University (Bachelor of Chemical Engineering 1962) and Harvard Business School (MBA 1966). Eberts' working career began as a start-up engineer for L'Air Liquide in Spain, Italy, Germany and France. He then spent three years as a Wall Street investor. He moved to London, England in 1971, where he joined Oppenheimer & Co., rising to the position of managing director of the UK brokerage and investment company in 1976.

With Goldcrest Films 
With no apparent prior interest in film, about 1977 he turned to film financing, and joined David Puttnam in founding Goldcrest Films, an independent film production company, for which he served as president and CEO. His first venture was the animated movie Watership Down.

While with the company in 1979, he made a disastrous personal investment of US$750,000 in Zulu Dawn, which took him almost a decade to recover from. He learned a great deal from this setback, as the output of the company was for the most part exceptional and financially rewarding, with such other films to its credit as The Howling, Chariots of Fire, Local Hero, Gandhi, The Killing Fields and The Dresser. Chariots of Fire and Gandhi won back-to-back Oscars in 1981 and 1982 respectively, and in the period from 1977 to 1983 the company's films received 30 Oscar nominations and won 15. He developed a reputation as an astute and shrewd financier. Rather than seek new talent, he chose to support established directors such as Sir Richard Attenborough, Roland Joffé, Jean-Jacques Annaud, John Boorman, many of whom have worked with him on several pictures.

He resigned from the company in 1984, but returned a year later to attempt to rescue it financially. From its early success of just a few years earlier, when it was seen as a possible saviour of the British film industry, the company had been brought to the brink of bankruptcy by the failure of three high-budget films – Revolution, The Mission and Absolute Beginners, all in 1985-1986.

Eberts continued on until 1987 when he resigned for the last time. The company would continue on under new ownership. Eberts detailed the disaster in his 1990 memoir, My Indecision Is Final: The Spectacular Rise and Fall of Goldcrest Films (co-authored with Terry Ilott).

As an independent 
Meanwhile, in 1985 he founded Allied Filmmakers, with Jean Gontier and became an affiliate of Pathé. With this company, in 1986 he made his debut as executive producer for Annaud's The Name of the Rose, based on the best-selling novel by Umberto Eco. He since produced or executive produced John Boorman's Hope and Glory, his second pair of back-to-back Oscar winners Driving Miss Daisy, Dances with Wolves, Robert Redford's A River Runs Through It and Henry Selick's adaptation of Roald Dahl's James and the Giant Peach. During this period Eberts was also responsible as executive for the expensive flop, The Adventures of Baron Munchausen, which went on to some popular success in home videocassette and DVD rentals.

Eberts moved to Paris in 1991.

Dances with Wolves was an early picture of Eberts to feature a Native American theme. Later productions included (as producer or executive producer), Bruce Beresford's Black Robe (1991), The Education of Little Tree (1997), and Richard Attenborough's Grey Owl (1999). The latter three pictures were all produced in Canada.

He also served as a co-executive producer (with Jeffrey Katzenberg) of Chicken Run. Other animated films Eberts produced include The Nutcracker Prince (1990), The Princess and the Cobbler, James and the Giant Peach, Doogal and Renaissance, and The Illusionist.

National Geographic Feature Films 
In 2002, Eberts became chairman of National Geographic Feature Films (NGFF) and executive produced such titles as the live action animal feature Two Brothers by Jean-Jacques Annaud. He also branched out into documentaries including Prisoner of Paradise, which was nominated for Best Picture in the feature documentary category at the 2003 Academy Awards, and America's Heart and Soul (2004). Under his direction, NGFF had an enormous success in 2005 by distributing the sleeper documentary March of the Penguins (original French title, La Marche de l'empereur) and he was working again recently with the Chariots of Fire director Hugh Hudson on a nature epic to be shot in Canada.

His final project, Jerusalem, an Imax 3D production due for release in 2013, chronicles a day in the life of three teenagers, a Jew, a Muslim and a Christian, in the Holy City. He had also been developing The Last Empress, a $60 million joint Sino-American venture about the ruthless Empress Dowager Cixi, who effectively controlled the Qing dynasty in the late 19th century.

Honours and other achievements 
In 1992 Eberts became an Officer of the Order of Canada. He was also awarded honorary doctorates by McGill University in 1998 and by Bishop's University in 1999. He served on the board of the Sundance Institute and the Sundance Channel. He was also co-founder and CEO of MPI International, which provides high-speed, two-way video transmission capabilities to telcos, cable companies, hotels, hospitals, and schools.

By 2005, Eberts had been associated with films garnering 66 Oscar nominations, including nine for Best Picture. In 2006, March of the Penguins won the Oscar for Best Documentary.

In Bishop's College School, the tennis court is named "Jake and Fiona Eberts Memorial Tennis Court".

Death 
Eberts was diagnosed in late 2010 with uveal melanoma, a rare cancer of the eye, which spread to his liver. He died at the age of 71 in Montreal on September 6, 2012.

Filmography 
He was a producer in all films unless otherwise noted.

Film

Thanks

Television

Thanks

See also 
List of Bishop's College School alumni

References

External links 
 Recent Biography
 Jake Eberts Tribute Wall
 
 

1941 births
2012 deaths
Bishop's University alumni
Film producers from Quebec
Canadian expatriates in England
Officers of the Order of Canada
Bishop's College School alumni
Anglophone Quebec people
Canadian media executives
Businesspeople from Montreal
Harvard Business School alumni
McGill University Faculty of Engineering alumni
Deaths from cancer in Quebec
Deaths from uveal melanoma